The 1st Security Force Assistance Brigade (1st SFAB) is a security force assistance brigade of the United States Army. It is based at Kelley Hill in Fort Benning, Georgia and is under the command of Colonel Christopher S. Landers and Command Sergeant Major Jerry Dodson. On February 8, 2018, the 1st SFAB held its official activation ceremony at the National Infantry Museum at Fort Benning.

Organization
SFAB’s mission is to support, assist, advise and liaise with conventional armed forces of partner nations. Operationally, an 800-Soldier SFAB would free up a 4500-Soldier brigade combat team from a train, advise, assist mission.

On 23 June 2016, General Mark A. Milley revealed plans for train/advise/assist brigades, consisting of seasoned Commissioned Officers, Warrant Officers and Non-commissioned Officers with a full chain of command, but no junior soldiers. The SFABs were to consist of 800 senior officers and NCOs, as a cadre to reform a full brigade combat team in a matter of months.  In May 2017, initial SFAB staffing was underway. The volunteer Officers, Warrant Officers and non-commissioned officers have previous experience in the same positions. Commanders and leaders have previously led at the same echelon. The remaining personnel, all NCOs, are being recruited from across the Army. Promotable E-4s (Specialists and Corporals) who volunteer for the SFAB are automatically promoted to Sergeant upon completion of the Combat Advisor Training Course at the Military Advisor Training Academy on Kelley Hill. In the event of a national emergency, SFABs could be augmented with new Soldiers from basic training and advanced individual training to form a full brigade combat team.

On 16 October 2017, BG Brian Mennes of Force Management in the Army's G3/5/7 announced accelerated deployment of the first two SFABs.  This was approved in early July 2017, by the Secretary of Defense and the Chief of Staff of the Army. These two SFABs would be trained in languages, how to work with interpreters, and equipped with the latest equipment including secure, but unclassified, communications and weapons to support coalition partners, as well as unmanned aircraft systems (UASs). An SFAB could provide up to 61 teams (possibly with additional soldiers for force protection).

A team of twelve advisors includes combat arms experts, a medic, and personnel specializing in military intelligence, logistics, maintenance, communications, and air support.

History

By October 2017, the 1st Security Force Assistance Brigade was established at Fort Benning.

On January 11, 2018, it was announced that the 1st SFAB would deploy to Afghanistan in Spring 2018.

On 8 February 2018, 1st SFAB held an activation ceremony at Fort Benning, revealing its colors and heraldry for the first time, and then cased its colors for the deployment to Afghanistan. It is made up of the first graduates of the Military Advisor Training Academy (MATA), also located at Fort Benning.

1st SFAB deployed to Afghanistan in February 2018 and returned to Fort Benning in November of the same year.

On 7 July 2018, Corporal Joseph Maciel, Task Force 1st Battalion, 28th Infantry Regiment, attached to 2nd Battalion 1st SFAB, was killed in an apparent insider attack in Uruzgan Province, Afghanistan. On 3 September 2018, 3rd Squadron, 1st SFAB Command Sgt. Maj. Timothy Bolyard was killed in an apparent insider attack while visiting the Afghan army's 4th Brigade, 203rd Corps.

The 1st SFAB conducted hundreds of persistent advising missions, and facilitated operations with thirty plus Afghan National Army Kandaks (Afghan battalions), 15+ Brigades, Regional Training Centers, and Afghan divisional and corps headquarters.

Six engineering advisor teams from the brigade provided hands-on experience and testing of secure communications between NATO allies and partners during Exercise "Allied Spirit X", led by the German 1st Panzer Division, in April 2019.

In Summer 2019 Combat Advisor Teams 1221 and 1222 became the first SFAB elements to participate in the United States Military Academy's Cadet Field Training, a four-week-long program which includes a six day field training exercise.

See also
Military Assistance Advisory Group

References

Brigades of the United States Army
Military advisory groups
Military units and formations established in 2018